William Leslie (16 March 1814 – 4 March 1880), was a Scottish Conservative Party politician.

Leslie was elected Conservative MP for Aberdeenshire at a by-election in 1861—caused by the succession of George Hamilton-Gordon to 5th Earl of Aberdeen—and held the seat until 1866 when he resigned.

References

External links
 

UK MPs 1859–1865
UK MPs 1865–1868
1814 births
1880 deaths
Scottish Tory MPs (pre-1912)